Al-Rastan Dam is an embankment dam on the Orontes River in the city of Al-Rastan, Homs Governorate, Syria. It was completed in 1960 with the primary purpose of irrigation. It was constructed by the Bulgarian firm Hydrostroy along with the Mouhardeh Dam, downstream and also on the Orontes.

See also
Lake Homs Dam – located upstream

References

Dams in Syria
Dams completed in 1960